Henry Wallace (16 February 1882 – 8 May 1917) was an English professional rugby league footballer who played in the 1900s and 1910s. Harry Wallace served as Private with the 10th Battalion of the Durham Light Infantry in World War I, and died in service at Arras, France, leaving behind a widow and five children.

Playing career

International honours
Harry Wallace won a cap for England while at Hull in 1908 against New Zealand.

County honours
Harry Wallace won cap(s) for Yorkshire while at Hull, including against New Zealand at Belle Vue, Wakefield on Wednesday 18 December 1907.

Challenge Cup Final appearances
Harry Wallace played  in Hull FC's 0-14 defeat by Hunslet in the 1908 Challenge Cup Final during the 1907–08 season at Fartown Ground, Huddersfield on Saturday 25 April 1908, in front of a crowd of 18,000, played  in the 0-17 defeat by Wakefield Trinity in the 1909 Challenge Cup Final during the 1908–09 season at Headingley Rugby Stadium, Leeds on Saturday 24 April 1909, in front of a crowd of 23,587. played  in the 7-7 draw with Leeds in the 1910 Challenge Cup Final during the 1909–10 season at Fartown Ground, Huddersfield, on Saturday 16 April 1910, in front of a crowd of 19,413, this was the first Challenge Cup Final to be drawn, and played , and scored a goal in the 12-26 defeat by Leeds in the 1910 Challenge Cup Final replay at Fartown Ground, Huddersfield, on Monday 18 April 1910, in front of a crowd of 11,608.

References

External links
Casualty details at Commonwealth War Graves Commission
(archived by web.archive.org) Stats → Past Players at hullfc.com
(archived by web.archive.org) Stats → Past Players → "W" at hullfc.com

1882 births
1917 deaths
British Army personnel of World War I
British military personnel killed in World War I
Durham Light Infantry soldiers
England national rugby league team players
English rugby league players
Hull F.C. players
Rugby league halfbacks
Rugby league players from Tyne and Wear
Yorkshire rugby league team players